"Lyric" is a song by Zwan. It was the second and final single from their album Mary Star of the Sea, and it was only released in the United Kingdom.

Track listing
 "Lyric" (Billy Corgan) – 3:21
 "Nobody 'Cept You" (Bob Dylan) – 4:13
 "Autumn Leaves" (Johnny Mercer, Joseph Kosma, Jacques Prévert) – 2:21

Charts

References

2002 songs
2003 singles
Songs written by Billy Corgan
Song recordings produced by Billy Corgan
Song recordings produced by Bjorn Thorsrud
Zwan songs